James D. Parriott (born November 14, 1950, in Denver, Colorado) is an American writer, director, and producer, with his own self named production company.

Career
He created the series: Voyagers!, Misfits of Science, Forever Knight, Educating Matt Waters, The American Embassy and Defying Gravity.

Awards
In addition to numerous awards won by series he has created or produced, Parriott himself has been nominated for a number of awards, and has won three; the Writers Guild of America TV Award (2006 & 2007), and the Producers Guild of America Television Producer of the Year Award in Episodic series (2007).

Credits

Film

Television

External links
 
 James D. Parriott at FilmReference.com

American male screenwriters
American television writers
American film directors
American television directors
American film producers
American television producers
Writers Guild of America Award winners
1950 births
Living people
Writers from Denver
American male television writers
Screenwriters from Colorado